Joseph Emerson Mays (born December 10, 1975) is a former Major League Baseball right-handed pitcher.

Mays is a 1994 graduate of Southeast High School in Bradenton, Florida. He also attended Manatee Community College in Bradenton. He and his wife, Melinda (née Rogers), have two children.

Minnesota Twins
Mays began his major league career with the Twins on April 7, 1999. He began the season in the bullpen before going to the rotation, he finished the season pitching in 49 games with a record of 6-11 for the Twins.

The following season he was implanted into the rotation, pitching poorly throughout the season, finishing with an ERA of 5.56 and a record of 7-15 in 31 games (28 starts).

He had his best season in 2001, going 17-13 with a 3.16 ERA. He led the league in ERA+ (143) and was selected to the All-Star Game. He pitched in a career high 233 innings and 4 complete games. In January 2002 he signed a four-year extension with the Twins for $20 million dollars that would last to the end of the 2005 season.

He missed all of the 2004 season after having Tommy John surgery performed on his pitching arm. Through 2003, he posted a 42-55 record with a 4.70 ERA. Mays successfully bounced back from his surgery to rejoin the Twins' starting rotation at the beginning of the 2005 season, and recorded his first win since the 2003 season on April 27, 2005 against the Kansas City Royals.

Due to his losing record and disappointing ERA, on August 26, 2005, Twins manager Ron Gardenhire demoted Mays to the Twins bullpen and called up Scott Baker from AAA Rochester to replace Mays in the pitching rotation.

Mays never recaptured the success of his 2001 season. From 2002 through 2005 he had a 5.81 ERA and a 77 ERA+.

On October 7, 2005, the Twins chose not to renew Mays' contract for 2006, making him a free agent.

Kansas City Royals
He signed with the Kansas City Royals on December 23, 2005. Mays' Royals career was short-lived, as he was released on May 16, 2006 after posting an 0-4 record in 6 starts with a 10.27 ERA.

Cincinnati Reds
On May 19, 2006, Mays signed a minor league contract with the Louisville Bats. On June 6, Mays had his contract purchased by the Reds.  However, Mays was designated for assignment on July 26, ending his short stint with the Reds.

Los Angeles Dodgers
Mays was a free agent through 2006. He signed a minor league contract with the Los Angeles Dodgers on February 7, .  The contract included an invitation to spring training, where Mays failed to make the big league roster. Mays requested and received his release on May 16, 2007 after pitching in 8 starts.

Personal

Mays is a distant cousin of submarine pitcher Carl Mays who threw the pitch that resulted in the death of Ray Chapman, the only Major League Baseball player to die during a game as a direct result of an on-field injury, on August 16, 1920.

References

External links

1975 births
Living people
Minnesota Twins players
Kansas City Royals players
Cincinnati Reds players
American League All-Stars
Major League Baseball pitchers
Baseball players from Flint, Michigan
Arizona League Mariners players
Everett AquaSox players
SCF Manatees baseball players
Wisconsin Timber Rattlers players
Lancaster JetHawks players
Fort Myers Miracle players
New Britain Rock Cats players
Salt Lake Buzz players
Louisville Bats players
Las Vegas 51s players
State College of Florida, Manatee–Sarasota alumni